Windy Ridge may refer to:

Australia
Windy Ridge, the name of a homestead in Western Australia

Ghana 
Windy Ridge, Takoradi

New Zealand
Windy Ridge, New Zealand, a suburb of North Shore

United States
Windy Ridge, a school in the Orange County Public School System of Orange County, Florida, U.S.A.
Windy Ridge, a housing development seven miles northwest of Charlotte, North Carolina, U.S.A.
Windy Ridge (Mount St. Helens), a part of the Mount St. Helens National Volcanic Monument

Other uses 
Windyridge, a 1912 novel by Willie Riley